Gallin is a municipality in the Ludwigslust-Parchim district, in Mecklenburg-Vorpommern, Germany.

See also
 Uri Gallin (1928–2021), Israeli Olympic discus thrower

References

Ludwigslust-Parchim